Furusawa (written: 古澤) is a Japanese surname. Notable people with the surname include:

, Japanese cross-country skier
, Japanese film director and screenwriter
, Japanese voice actor

Japanese-language surnames